Sarkis Assadourian (born January 25, 1948) is an Armenian-Canadian politician from the Liberal Party of Canada. He became the first Armenian-Canadian to be elected to the House of Commons, with great support of the Armenian community of Toronto.

Background
Assadourian was born in Aleppo, Syria. His family emigrated soon after. He studied painting at the Chicago Academy of Fine Arts. In 1970 he moved to Toronto where he worked as a property manager. He also worked as a consultant on multiculturalism for both the provincial and federal governments.

Assadourian and his wife Zaza have four children. He remains a supporter of Armenian causes and is an active member of the Richmond Hill Provincial Liberal Association.

Politics
In 1988, Assadourian entered politics as the Liberal candidate in the riding of Don Valley North. He won the Liberal nomination over rival Sarmite Bulte. During the campaign debate he said that he wanted, "honest and open government, for a change." The New Democratic Party candidate, Anton Kuerti reminded him that the Tories were elected in 1984 criticising the Liberals on the same issue. Assadourian stated that he was staunchly against abortion which was a hot button issue during the campaign. He lost the election to Conservative candidate Barbara Greene by 604 votes.

In 1993 he ran again and this time won against Greene by 14,054 votes in what was a general rout of the Conservatives in Toronto and nationwide. In 1997, Assadourian moved seats to Brampton Centre. In 2003, he served as Parliamentary Secretary to the Minister of Citizenship and Immigration. He did not run in the 2004 election.

Assadourian ran in the 2010 Richmond Hill Municipal Elections in Ward 3. He placed fifth out of seven candidates. He ran again in 2022 in Ward 5, placing eighth out of 10 candidates.

After politics
He now serves as a Citizenship Judge in Toronto.

Electoral record

References

External links

1948 births
Canadian citizenship judges
Canadian people of Armenian descent
Liberal Party of Canada MPs
Living people
Members of the House of Commons of Canada from Ontario
People from Aleppo
Politicians from Brampton
Syrian people of Armenian descent
Syrian emigrants to Canada
Ethnic Armenian politicians
21st-century Canadian politicians
Syrian Christians
Armenian Christians
Canadian politicians of Syrian descent